Kalma station is a railway station in Kalma-dong, an industrial neighbourhood in the eastern part of Wŏnsan city, Kangwŏn province, North Korea, on the Kangwŏn Line of the Korean State Railway. It is also the start of the Wŏnsanhang Line to Wŏnsan Port.

Kalma station handles freight traffic destined for and shipped from Wŏnsan city, and serves several large industries, including the 4 June Rolling Stock Works, which is one of the DPRK's largest railway equipment factories.

The station, along with the rest of the former Kyŏngwŏn Line, was opened by the Chosen Government Railway on 16 August 1914.

References

Railway stations in North Korea